Jean-Marc Pastor (born 12 February 1950) is a member of the Senate of France, representing the Tarn department. He is a member of the Socialist Party.

References
 Page on the Senate website 

1950 births
Living people
French Senators of the Fifth Republic
Socialist Party (France) politicians
Senators of Tarn (department)
Place of birth missing (living people)